Money Money is a 1994 Indian Telugu-language comedy film written and directed by Siva Nageswara Rao. It is produced by Ram Gopal Varma under his banner Varma Creations. The film serves as a sequel to the 1993 film Money.

It stars an ensemble cast including J. D. Chakravarthy, Chinna, Jayasudha, Renuka Shahane, Surabhi, Paresh Rawal and Brahmanandam from the previous film. Jagapathi Babu and Urmila Matondkar have reprised their roles in the film Gaayam, directed by Ram Gopal Varma himself. The music has been composed by Kommineni Sri, the son of the legendary music composer K. Chakravarthy.

A sequel to the film Money Money, More Money, a remake of the 2006 Hindi comedy film Darwaza Band Rakho, was released in 2011 with only J. D. Chakravarthy & Brahmanandam reprising their roles as Chakri and Khan Dada respectively. The film was a hit at the box office.

Plot
The film begins with a recap of Money. After 363 days Chakri, Bose, Renu, and Vijaya are traveling back from the tour. They halt at Subba Rao's workplace Dhaba where he is startled to view Vijaya alive. Immediately, he rushes back and calls for the aid of his former criminal ally Allaudin. Moreover, he learns through their family Lawyer that he has one more chance to procure the property following Vijaya's death. Subba Rao instructs Allaudin to wipe out Vijaya which he delays. Meanwhile, a charming girl Sudha enters as a new appointee in Vijaya's company whom Chakri loves. Besides, Khan Dada is admitted to a mental asylum by the Police considering him insane. Anyhow, he absconds and seeks vengeance against Chakri which end hilarious. Parallelly as a glitter, Durga the crime lord along with his cousin Chitra visits the film theater before an attack. Yadagiri one that sang the Nizam Pori song meets and infatuated with Chitra.

Now as a flabbergast, Sudha is shown as defrauding who abets Allaudin to execute his works through Vijaya’s company. Allaudin is double-crossing Subba Rao for his self-interest which he gazes. Hence, Allaudin orders the slaughter of Subba Rao when he is safeguarded by Bose & Chakri. Subba Rao is set foot on Vijaya as reformed and expresses regret when she heartfully welcomes him. Currently, Subba Rao divulges the true shade of Sudha. Even, Chakri also identifies it and rebukes her for turning his love to account. At that point, Sudha proclaims that her brother Brahmaji the sidekick of Allaudin has been incriminated in a crime and seized. Thus, she became a puppet in his hand. Being cognizant of it, Chakri understands Sudha’s virtue, Vijaya acquits her brother, and the police raid Allaudin’s den. However, he skips and kidnaps Subba Rao. At last, the entire team sets him free and Khan Dada rests at the asylum. Finally, the movie ends with Allaudin begging on the roads and giving us a call for Money Money Money.

Cast

 J. D. Chakravarthy as Chakri
 Chinna as Bose
 Jayasudha as Vijaya
 Renuka Shahane as Renu
 Surabhi as Sudha
 Kota Srinivasa Rao as Allaudin, that sings Bhadram be careful song in Money 
 Brahmanandam as Khan Dada
 Paresh Rawal as Subba Rao
 Tanikella Bharani as Manikyam & Gaayam Lawyer Saab (Dual role)
 Sharat Saxena as a Police officer
 Brahmaji as Brahmaji
 Banerjee as Gaayam Benerjee
 Jeedigunta Sridhar as Mental Doctor
 Kadambari Kiran as Telephone Booth Owner
 Chinni Jayanth as Peon
 Kallu Chidambaram as Lawyer
 Tarzan as Jaggu
 Uttej as Yadagiri
 Narsing Yadav as Narsing
 Jagapathi Babu (cameo) as Gaayam Durga 
 Urmila Matondkar (cameo) as Gaayam Chitra

Soundtrack

Music composed by Sri. Lyrics are written by Sirivennela Sitarama Sastry. Music was released by VMG Cassettes Audio Company.

Production
Krishna Vamsi ghost-directed this film and he preferred his name uncredited. Ramji wanted to make a sequel to Money, as no sequel had happened in India and he wanted Vamsi to direct Money Money. Vamsi expressed his reservations that he did not want to launch himself with this kind of film. Then Ramu told him that he had to direct it. Vamsi kept a condition that Vamsi's name must not be there in the titles (ghost direction). He assured him that if he saw the finished product, he would ask for credit. Then Money Money was started under Vamsi's direction. He tried all types of techniques and experimented with them. In that film, he shot one song with just four shots (Kota song "Em Kompa Munagadoi") and another one with 357 shots (Chakri and Surabhi duet "Left and Right Endukanta" at Golkonda Fort). The Kota song took 6 hours to shoot and the Chakri duet took 6 days. Ramji scolded Vamsi about his inconsistency. Ramji gave him a choice to change his mind about the director's name. After Vamsi's refusal, Ramuji requested Siva Nageswara Rao to lend his name and it was released. Vamsi detached himself from the film.

Other
 VCDs and DVDs on - VOLGA Videos, Hyderabad

References

External links
 

1994 films
1990s Telugu-language films
1994 comedy-drama films
Indian buddy comedy-drama films
Indian sequel films
Films directed by Siva Nageswara Rao